Children of a Lesser God is a 2018 South Korean television series starring Kang Ji-hwan and Kim Ok-bin. It aired on OCN's Saturdays and Sundays at 22:20 (KST) time slot from March 3 to April 22, 2018.

Synopsis
The story of two detectives who work together to unravel the corruption behind a tragedy that happens within a powerful organization.

Cast

Main
 Kang Ji-hwan as Cheon Jae-in, an elite and genius detective who is guided by only facts, logic and numbers.
 Kim Ok-vin as Kim Dan, a warm-hearted rookie detective who has a supernatural ability to see death.
 Han Seo-jin as young Kim Dan

Supporting
  as Joo Ha-min
 Lee Elijah as Baek A-hyeon
 Lee Jae-yong as Kook Han-joo
 Jang Gwang as Pastor Wang
 Lee Hyo-jung as Baek Do-gyu
  as Gye Do-hoon
 Ahn Gil-kang as Kim Ho-ki
 Hong Seo-young as Chun Su-in
  as Choi Sung-ki
 Joo Suk-tae as Park Ji-hoon, Team leader
 Kim Ji-yoo as Da Yun
 Kim Dong-young as serial killer Han Sang-goo

Production
 The first script reading of the cast was held on December 17, 2017 at CJ E&M in Sangam-dong.
 Jo Min-ki originally played Kook Han-joo but he was removed from the series after accusations of sexual harassment and assault. He was replaced by Lee Jae-yong.

Viewership

References

External links
  
 
 

OCN television dramas
Television series by Studio Dragon
Korean-language television shows
2018 South Korean television series debuts
2018 South Korean television series endings
South Korean thriller television series
South Korean mystery television series